Raffles (Spanish Raffles mexicano) is a 1958 Mexican crime film directed by Alejandro Galindo and starring Rafael Bertrand, María Duval and Prudencia Grifell. The film is based on E.W. Hornung books about the British gentleman thief A.J. Raffles, who is portrayed here as a Mexican.

Es importante destacar que esta película no se encuentra disponible en ningún servicio,ni en ninguna página de Internet.solo hay un tráiler de unos pocos segundos en YouTube.por lo cual la cultura mexicana en lo referente a esta producción esta extinta. 

The film's sets were designed by the art director Gunther Gerszo.

Cast
 Pepe Alameda 
 Miguel Arenas 
 León Barroso
 José Baviera
 Rafael Bertrand as Roberto 'Rafles' 
 Quintín Bulnes
 Alfonso Carti 
 Víctor Manuel Castro 
 Mario Cid 
 Manuel Dondé 
 María Duval as Señorita Espíndola 
 Prudencia Grifell as Doña Constancia 
 Arturo Martinez as Comandante  
 Roberto Meyer
 Martha Mijares as Alicia 
 Mario Sevilla
 Manuel Trejo Morales 
 Jorge Trevino

References

Bibliography 
 Hardy, Phil. The BFI Companion to Crime. A&C Black, 1997.

External links 
 

1958 films
1958 crime films
Mexican crime films
1950s Spanish-language films
Films directed by Alejandro Galindo
Works based on A. J. Raffles
Films set in Mexico
1950s Mexican films